John Joseph Rawlings was a British engineer and inventor of the wall plug, also known from his name as the rawlplug. He invented it in around 1910-11, registered a patent in 1911, trademarked the rawlplug name in 1912 and was granted the patent in 1913. In 1919 his company, formerly known as the Rawlings Brothers, was renamed to Rawlplug Ltd.

Wall plug
The original device was a jute fibre cylinder inserted into a hole drilled in the masonry and into which the screw was inserted. The deeper the screw penetrated, the more the fibre expanded and the greater the grip against the masonry. The jute was replaced by a thermoplastic plug in the 1960s, injection moulded singly, or in multiples attached together by the original sprue. Each plug can be easily twisted off the sprue when needed.

Wall bolt

The company went on to develop the Rawlbolt, a fitting with similar function but much greater size and strength.

References
Get a grip! – the invention of the Rawlplug

External links
Short note

British engineers
Year of death missing
Year of birth missing
Articles containing video clips